The 2022 Norwegian Third Division (referred to as Norsk Tipping-ligaen for sponsorship reasons) was a fourth-tier Norwegian football league season. The league consisted of 84 teams divided into 6 groups of 14 teams each. The season started on 9 April 2022 and ended on 23 October 2022. The league was played as a double round-robin tournament, where all teams played 26 matches.

League tables

Group 1

Group 2

Group 3

Group 4

Group 5

Group 6

Top scorers

References

Norwegian Third Division seasons
4
Norway
Norway